Naqareh-ye Naveh Kesh (also Romanized as Naqāreh-ye Nāveh Kesh and Naqāreh-ye Nāveh Kash; also known as Nākura, Naqāreh, and Naqqareh) is a village in Shurab Rural District, Veysian District, Dowreh County, Lorestan Province, Iran. At the 2006 census, its population was 103, in 27 families.

References 

Towns and villages in Dowreh County